Idaho Cobalt Operations (ICO) is a cobalt mine located in Lemhi County, Idaho in the United States near the town of Salmon. The mine has reserves amounting to 3.8 million tonnes of ore grading 0.5% cobalt. The mine will also produce copper and gold.

In 2019, the owner of the mine, the Canada-based Ecobalt Solutions, was acquired by the Australia-based Jervois Mining. The mine reopened in October 2022 as the only active cobalt mine in the United States. The project is located directly adjacent to the inactive Blackbird mine.

Background 
Manufacture of electric cars drives increased demand for cobalt in the United States. This has prompted the federal government to prioritise extraction of domestic cobalt reserves (as well as lithium and other critical minerals). Most cobalt on the global market comes from the Democratic Republic of the Congo (DRC) and is controlled by China. Mining in the DRC is also notorious for human rights violations.

The Idaho cobalt mine is located in a cobalt belt that was mined intermittently beginning in the late 1800s. Full scale cobalt mining began at Blackbird mine in 1949 and was closed in the late 1980s leaving contaminated water and a superfund site.

References

External links 

Buildings and structures in Lemhi County, Idaho
Cobalt mines in the United States
Copper mines in the United States
Gold mines in the United States
Mines in Idaho